Thomas Lars Wassberg (born 27 March 1956) is a Swedish former cross-country skier. A fast skating style – push for every leg – is still called "Wassberg" after him in several countries. Wassberg's skiing idols when growing up were Sixten Jernberg and Oddvar Brå. He has described his mental strength and physical fitness as his greatest abilities as a skier, with his main weakness being a lack of sprinting ability.

Wassberg won four Olympic gold medals: in 15 km (1980), 50 km (1984), and the 4 × 10 km relay (1984, 1988), and served as the Olympic flag bearer for Sweden in 1988. At the FIS Nordic World Ski Championships, he earned three golds (50 km: 1982, 30 km: 1987, and 4 × 10 km relay: 1987), three silvers (15 km: 1985, 1987; 50 km (1987), and one bronze (4 × 10 km relay: 1985). Additionally, Wassberg won the 50 km at the Holmenkollen ski festival three times (1980, 1982 and 1987) and the 15 km twice (1979, 1985).

At the 1980 Winter Olympics in Lake Placid, Wassberg edged out Finland's Juha Mieto by 0.01 seconds in the 15 km, the closest cross-country ski race in Olympic history. Wassberg subsequently suggested to Mieto that the gold medal should be split between them "as one one-hundredth of a second is nothing in a 15-kilometer race". This incident led the International Ski Federation (FIS) to change their timing to the nearest one-tenth of a second. It also resulted in an apocryphal urban legend that Wassberg and Mieto's medals were cut in half and re-welded into half-gold, half-silver medals. At the 1984 Winter Olympics, Wassberg beat out fellow Swede Gunde Svan by 4.9 seconds in the 50 km, the closest margin of victory ever in that event until Giorgio Di Centa edged out Yevgeny Dementyev by 0.8 seconds at the 2006 Winter Olympics though the 2006 event was a mass start event while the 1984 event was an interval start event.

He won the World Cup in 1977, and in 1980 was awarded the Holmenkollen medal. For some reason his teammate Sven-Åke Lundbäck did not receive the Svenska Dagbladet Gold Medal in 1978. In protest to this decision Wassberg refused to accept his Svenska Dagbladet Gold Medal in 1980.

According to Bengt Erik Bengtsson, Chief of the Nordic Office of the FIS from 1984 to 2004, Wassberg was the first to suggest in 1984 the splitting of the sport of cross country skiing into classic and freestyle disciplines. This was subsequently implemented by FIS in 1986.

After retiring from competitions Wassberg worked as a sports reporter for Swedish Radio and a cross-country skiing coach for his club Åsarna IK. In 2009 he appeared on Swedish television in the show contests Mästarnas mästare, and in 2016 participated in Let's Dance 2016 which was broadcast on TV4. In the 2010s he oversaw the preparation of ski tracks for Åsarna IK, organized bird hunting events for tourists and worked as a forester.

Cross-country skiing results
All results are sourced from the International Ski Federation (FIS).

Olympic Games
 4 medals – (4 gold)

World Championships
 7 medals – (3 gold, 3 silver, 1 bronze)

World  Cup

Season standings

Individual podiums
 6 victories 
 18 podiums

Team podiums
 7 victories 
 10 podiums 

Note:  Until the 1999 World Championships and the 1994 Winter Olympics, World Championship and Olympic races were included in the World Cup scoring system.

References

External links

Holmenkollen medalists – click Holmenkollmedaljen for downloadable pdf file 
Holmenkollen winners since 1892 – click Vinnere for downloadable pdf file 
Wassberg tar emot Bragdguldet – efter 33 år

1956 births
Living people
People from Årjäng Municipality
Cross-country skiers from Värmland County
Cross-country skiers at the 1976 Winter Olympics
Cross-country skiers at the 1980 Winter Olympics
Cross-country skiers at the 1984 Winter Olympics
Cross-country skiers at the 1988 Winter Olympics
Holmenkollen medalists
Holmenkollen Ski Festival winners
Olympic cross-country skiers of Sweden
Olympic gold medalists for Sweden
Swedish male cross-country skiers
Olympic medalists in cross-country skiing
FIS Nordic World Ski Championships medalists in cross-country skiing
Medalists at the 1984 Winter Olympics
Åsarna IK skiers
Medalists at the 1988 Winter Olympics
Medalists at the 1980 Winter Olympics